The president of Transnistria is the highest elected official of Transnistria, a small unrecognized country which declared independence from Moldova in 1990. The president of the republic is the country's head of state and is also commander in chief of its armed forces. Per the Constitution of Transnistria, he also represents the country abroad.

The President of the Pridnestrovian Moldavian Republic, as Transnistria is officially called, is elected by the citizens of the republic on the basis of universal, equal and direct suffrage by secret ballot for a term of five years.

The current president is Vadim Krasnoselsky, since 16 December 2016. He was elected in the 2016 election and re-elected in the 2021 election.

Non-presidential heads of state

List of presidents of Transnistria

Timeline

Latest election

See also
 Politics of Transnistria
 Vice President of Transnistria
 Prime Minister of Transnistria

References

External links
 Official PMR presidential site (in Russian)
 Unofficial presidential website

Transnistria
 
Transnistria